The Italian Air Force Museum is an aircraft museum at Vigna di Valle, on Lake Bracciano (Lazio), in central Italy. The museum's collection has an emphasis on Italian machines and seaplanes. While maintaining the technical and historical aspects, the museum is also dedicated to the influence aviation has had on Italian art, featuring works by Futurist painters Pietro Annigoni, Giacomo Balla, and Tato; and contemporary art such as Flight: Papiers froissés (literally crumpled paper) by Antonio Papasso.

Collection

Propeller aircraft 

 Ansaldo AC.2
 Ansaldo SVA 5
 Blériot XI
 Caproni Ca.3
 Caproni Ca.100
 Cant Z.506S Airone
 Douglas C47A Skytrain
 Fiat C.29
 Fiat CR.32
 Fiat CR.42 Falco
 Fiat G.49
 Fiat G.55
 Fiat G.59 4B
 Fiat G.212
 Fieseler Fi 156
 Grumman HU-16A Albatross
 Grumman S2F-1 Tracker
 IMAM Ro.37 bis
 IMAM Ro.41 (under restoration)
 IMAM Ro.43
 Lohner L
 Macchi M.B.308
 Macchi MB.323
 Macchi M.39
 Macchi M.67
 Macchi M.416
 Macchi-Castoldi MC.72
 Macchi-Hanriot HD.1
 Macchi MC.200
 Macchi MC.202
 Macchi MC.205
 Nardi FN.305
 North American P-51D
 North American T-6J
 Piaggio P.166 ML-1
 SAI Ambrosini S.7
 Savoia-Marchetti S.56
 Savoia-Marchetti SM.79
 Savoia-Marchetti SM.82
 SIAI Marchetti SF.260M
 Spad VII
 Stinson L-5 Sentinel
 Supermarine Spitfire Mk IX
 Wright N°4 (1960s built airworthy replica)

Gliders 
 Libratore Allievo Cantù
 CVV-6 Canguro Pallas

Jet aircraft 

 Aerfer Ariete
 Aerfer Sagittario 2
 Aermacchi MB-326
 Aermacchi MB-339PAN
 Canadair CL-13 Sabre
 Campini-Caproni C.C.2
 de Havilland DH-113 Vampire NF54
 Fiat G.80-3B
 Fiat G.91 PAN (Frecce Tricolori)
 Fiat G.91 R
 Fiat G.91 T
 Lockheed (Fiat) F-104G Starfighter
 Lockheed RT-33
 North American-Fiat F-86K Sabre
 Panavia Tornado F3
 Piaggio PD.808
 Republic F-84F Thunderstreak
 Republic F-84G Thunderjet
 Republic RF-84F Thunderflash (under restoration)
 Saab J29 Tunnan (only included plane never operated by Italian Air Force)

Helicopters 
 Aer Lualdi L.59
 Agusta Bell AB.204 B
 Agusta Bell AB.47 G2
 Agusta Sikorsky SH-3D/TS "Pope Helicopter"

Engines

Piston engines

 Alfa Romeo 126 RC.34
 Allison V-1710
 Argus As10C
 Daimler-Benz DB 605
 Fiat A.20
 Fiat A.22T
 Fiat A.24
 Fiat A.54
 Fiat AS.6
 Fiat AS.8
 Hispano-Suiza 8
 Isotta Fraschini 12 DB
 Isotta Fraschini Asso 750 RC 35
 Maybach-Zeppelin Luftschiffmotor
 Rolls-Royce Merlin
 SPA 6A
 SPA Faccioli
 Wright "Type 4"

Jet engines
 General Electric J47
 Junkers Jumo 004
 Wright J65

See also
List of aerospace museums

Sources
 Italian Air Force Museum

External links 

 TurismoBracciano - Museum of the Italian Airforce
 The Italian Airforce Museum, Bracciano 

Italian Air Force
Air force museums
Museums in Lazio
Transport museums in Italy
Military and war museums in Italy
Aerospace museums in Italy
Bracciano